The Yugoslavia men's national tennis team competed from 1927 to 2003 and represented the Kingdom of Yugoslavia (up to 1929 known as the Kingdom of Serbs, Croats and Slovenes) from 1927 to 1939, the Socialist Federal Republic of Yugoslavia (up to 1963 the Federal People's Republic of Yugoslavia) from 1946 to 1992, and the Federal Republic of Yugoslavia from 1995 to 2003. It was organised by the Yugoslav Tennis Association. Following the breakup of Yugoslavia in the 1990s, separate teams were created for the new nations which split apart from Yugoslavia:

 Croatia men's national tennis team (began competing in 1993)
 Slovenia men's national tennis team (began competing in 1993)
 North Macedonia men's national tennis team (began competing in 1995 as the former Yugoslav Republic of Macedonia)
 Bosnia and Herzegovina men's national tennis team (began competing in 1996)

A team representing the Federal Republic of Yugoslavia returned to competing again from 1995. From 2003 this country was renamed Serbia and Montenegro and the Davis Cup team was renamed to reflect the same from 2004, bringing to an end Yugoslav participation in the Davis Cup. Following further splits in 2006, several new teams were created for the relevant constituent parts:

 Serbia Davis Cup team (began competing in 2007)
 Montenegro Davis Cup team (began competing in 2007)
 Kosovo Davis Cup team (began competing in 2016)

For history and records of the Federal Republic of Yugoslavia (consisting of only Montenegro and of Serbia) and the State Union of Serbia and Montenegro, see Serbia and Montenegro Davis Cup team.

In 1952, Dragutin Mitić and Milan Branović, with 29 ties and 4 ties respectively, defected from the Federal People's Republic of Yugoslavia.

Players
Josip Palada – 37 ties
Dragutin Mitić – 29 ties
Franjo Punčec – 26 ties
Boro Jovanović – 25 ties
Nikola Pilić – 23 ties
Željko Franulović – 22 ties
Slobodan Živojinović – 21 ties
Franjo Kukuljević – 18 ties
Marko Ostoja – 11 ties 
Ilija Panajotovic – 11 ties
Zoltan Ilin – 7 ties
Vladimir Petrović – 7 ties
Franjo Šefer – 7 ties
Krešimir Friedrich – 3 ties

Win–loss record

Results
Kingdom of Yugoslavia
 1927 – Europe zone, 2nd round (bye, losing to India 0–3)
 1928 – Europe zone, 1st round (losing to Finland 1–4)
 1929 – Europe zone, 1st round (losing to Greece 1–4)
 1930 – Europe zone, 2nd round (beating Sweden 5–0, losing to Spain 0–5)
 1931 – Europe zone, 2nd round (bye, losing to Japan 0–5)
 1932 – Europe zone, 2nd round (bye, losing to Denmark 1–4)

See also
Yugoslavia Fed Cup team

References

External links

Davis
δ Yugoslavia